Tony Bacon is an American veteran professional table football player. He was a world champion on the Dynamo table in three successive years from 1985 to 1987.

See also
 List of world table football champions

References
Profile at tablesoccer.org
 Profile at FoosWorld.com

Living people
World champions in table football
Year of birth missing (living people)